Glendale is the anglicised version of the Gaelic Gleann Dail, which means valley of fertile, low-lying arable land.

It may refer to:

Places

Australia
Glendale, New South Wales
Stockland Glendale, a shopping centre
Glendale, Queensland, a locality in the Shire of Livingstone

Canada
Glendale, Calgary, Alberta, a neighbourhood
Glendale, Nova Scotia
Glendale Secondary School, a highschool in Hamilton, Ontario

New Zealand
Glendale, New Zealand, a suburb of Wainuiomata, Lower Hutt

United Kingdom
Glendale, Northumberland, England
Glendale, Skye, Scotland
Glendale, a neighbourhood of Robroyston, Glasgow, Scotland

United States
Glendale, Arizona, largest city with this name
Glendale, California, a city in Los Angeles County
Glendale University College of Law in Glendale, California
 Glendale Boulevard
 Glendale Freeway
Glendale, Humboldt County, California
Glendale, Colorado, in Arapahoe County
Glendale, Boulder County, Colorado 
Glendale, Idaho
Glendale Heights, Illinois
Glendale, Illinois
Glendale, Daviess County, Indiana
Glendale, Indianapolis, Indiana
Glendale, Kansas
Glendale, Kentucky
Glendale, Massachusetts
Glendale, Missouri
Glendale, Nevada
 Glendale Avenue
Glendale, New Hampshire
Glendale, Camden County, New Jersey
Glendale, Mercer County, New Jersey
Glendale, Queens, New York
Glendale Township, Logan County, North Dakota
Glendale, Ohio
Glendale, Oklahoma
Glendale, Oregon
Glendale University, an unaccredited online school (not affiliated with the Glendale University College of Law)
Glendale, Rhode Island
Glendale, Utah, a town in Kane County
Glendale, Salt Lake City, Utah, a neighborhood
Glendale, Washington
Glendale, Wisconsin, a city in Milwaukee County
Glendale, Monroe County, Wisconsin, a town
Glendale (community), Monroe County, Wisconsin, an unincorporated community

Other uses
 Battle of Glendale, a battle of the American Civil War in Henrico County, Virginia
 A character in the animated streaming television series Centaurworld

See also
 Glendale High School (disambiguation)
 Glen Dale (disambiguation)
 Glenn Dale (disambiguation)
 Glenndale (disambiguation)